The Mikoyan PAK DP is a Russian programme to develop a stealth interceptor aircraft/heavy fighter under development by Mikoyan to replace the Mikoyan MiG-31 in the Russian Air Force in mid-2030s. It is often referred to as the Mikoyan MiG-41, because its project code is izdeliye 41 (product 41), but an official designation has not been given, as Russian planes only receive an official designation when they are about to enter service. According to Russian defence analyst Vasily Kashin, the MiG-41 would be considered a 5++ or 6th generation project.

Development
It was argued at first that the work on the supersonic PAK DP MiG-41 interceptor was making use of the MiG-701 (Izdeliye 7.01), Mikoyan MiG-301 and Mikoyan MiG-321 projects begun in the 1990s. 

As of July 2016, no official data was available concerning the aircraft's capabilities. It was speculated that it could enter service by the mid-2020s or 2030s. As an interceptor, its primary mission was rumored to offset future reconnaissance aircraft currently being developed by the United States and China. To achieve high speeds, the aircraft would need to be equipped with ramjet or turboramjet engines.

The design of the PAK DP was finalized by the end of 2019, at the same time the research work was completed. In 2020, within that research framework, the Russian Ministry of Defense selected the most promising project. Work in this area now continues in R&D and with wind tunnel models. Ilya Tarasenko, the general director of the MiG corporation, as well as the head of the Sukhoi company, said in an interview in July 2020 that the PAK DP will be created on the basis of the MiG-31's design.

According to Izvestia, the PAK DP is envisioned to become an interceptor of hypersonic missiles by carrying a multifunctional long-range interceptor missile system (MPKR DP) that will dispense several sub-missiles in order to increase the chance of intercepting hypersonic weapons. The PAK DP is also intended to carry anti-satellite missiles.

In January 2021, Rostec Corporation, the owner of Mikoyan, announced that the PAK DP had entered the development phase.

Design
In an interview for RT, the Director General of RSK MiG, Ilya Tarasenko, speculated that it would be a new construction capable of Mach number 4–4.3, equipped with an anti-missile laser, and said would be able to operate at very high altitudes and even in near space. He also stated that it could be transformed into an unmanned version later. If purchased by the Russian Air Force, he said that the first production PAK DP would be completed in 2025.

The aircraft may cruise at speeds of at least  and fly at high altitudes (at levels between the stratopause and the tropopause, i.e. below 45,000 meters and above 12,000 meters) to cover the most amount of Russia's very large territory in the shortest period of time. It could use a variant of the Izdeliye 30 engines currently under development for the Su-57. It was said that the PAK DP will use stealth technology.

An unmanned version is also under consideration.

See also 
Global Combat Air Programme
F/A-XX program
Next Generation Air Dominance
Future Combat Air System

References

Mikoyan aircraft
Proposed aircraft of Russia
Proposed military aircraft
Soviet and Russian fighter aircraft
Stealth aircraft
Twinjets